Golam Rabbani (died 10 January 2011) was a Bangladeshi politician who served as a Jatiya Sangsad member representing the Joypurhat-1 constituency.

References

1950s births
2011 deaths
People from Joypurhat District
Bangladesh Nationalist Party politicians
5th Jatiya Sangsad members